= Irreligion in Guyana =

Irreligion in Guyana refers to the lack of belief in religion, secularity or atheism in the country. An estimated 4 percent of the population does not profess any religion, while Hinduism and Christianity are the predominant religions in Guyana, accounting for approximately 28 percent and 57 percent of the population, respectively.

The importance of religion in Guyana goes back to the colonial period, in which Christianity served as a prerequisite to social acceptance. The Constitution of Guyana affirms that Guyana is a secular state although Christianity still dominates on contemporary issues of public morality. "Blasphemous libel, obstruction of the performance of a religious service, disturbing a congregation or preacher" are all punishable by law.

In 2015, a “universal prayer” was established to replace Christian prayers commonly practiced in public schools, but as of 2018 Christian prayer continued in at least some schools regardless of the individual student’s beliefs.
